The following list is a complete collection of results for the Australia National Rugby League Team. It includes Test matches, World Cup matches and Tests played under the banner of Super League (Australia).

All-time records

Test Matches 

Below is the table of the official representative rugby league matches played by Australia at test level up until 20 November 2022:

Test Matches & Internationals 

Bold indicates World Cup match.Italics indicates that an Australasian team played, consisting of players also from New Zealand.

1900s

1910s

1920s

1930s

1940s

1950s

1960s

1970s

1980s

1990s 

1 These matches are only recognised as tests by the Australian Rugby League (ARL).

Super League Tests 
The following Super League matches are considered to be Tests by the Rugby League International Federation, New Zealand Rugby League and Rugby Football League, but not by the Australian Rugby League.

2000s

2010s

2020s

Exhibition matches 

 R.L. = Rugby League
 R.U. = Rugby Union

See also

 Australian national rugby league team
 Rugby League World Cup
 Australian Rugby League

References

External links 
Australia – Results at rugbyleagueproject.org

Results
National team results